The 1978 Michigan Attorney General election was held on November 7, 1978. Incumbent Democrat Frank J. Kelley defeated Republican nominee Stephen C. Bransdorfer with 67.50% of the vote.

Bransdorfer conceded the election early, before 10% of the return votes were counted.

General election

Candidates
Major party candidates
Frank J. Kelley, Democratic
Stephen C. Bransdorfer, Republican
Robert W. Roddis, Libertarian

Results

References

Attorney General
Michigan Attorney General elections
November 1978 events in the United States
Michigan